Eldon Coombe (born c. 1941) is a Canadian curler from Ottawa, Ontario. Coombe is a native of Kingston, Ontario. He began curling at age 15.

Coombe and his Ottawa Curling Club rink of third Keith Forgues, Second Jim Patrick and Lead Barry Provost "dominated the curling scene from the mid 60s to the mid 70s". The pinnacle of their career came in 1972 when they won the Ontario British Consols trophy, defeating Bob Woods of Toronto 9-8 at the Earl Armstrong Arena in nearby Gloucester, Ontario. This earned them the right to play at the 1972 Macdonald Brier, Canada's national men's curling championship. They were the first rink from the Ottawa area to do so. At the 1972 Brier, they finished with a 6-4 record, tied for third place with Alberta and Saskatchewan.

Coombe still curls today at the Ottawa Curling Club. In 2005 he won the provincial master's championship (curlers over 60 years old). In 2012, Coombe won the provincial Grand Masters championship, for curlers over 70.

Coombe was a survey technician.

References 

1940s births
Living people
Sportspeople from Kingston, Ontario
Curlers from Ottawa